Ringmasters is a Swedish barbershop quartet affiliated with the Society of Nordic Barbershop Singers (SNOBS). The quartet received first place gold medals at the Nordic Barbershop Quartet Contest in Stockholm (April 2008), and won the Barbershop Harmony Society International Collegiate Championship in July 2008 in Nashville, Tennessee. On July 8, 2012, at the Society's International Convention in Portland, Oregon, they became the first quartet from outside North America to win the prestigious gold medal as International Quartet Champions. The quartet sings non-traditional barbershop harmonies with a contemporary touch. They still tour and perform all over the world.

Background 
As a competing barbershop quartet, Ringmasters has earned several awards and accolades, the most prestigious being the Barbershop Harmony Society International Quartet Championship Gold Medal in Portland, Oregon on July 8, 2012. Their other accomplishments include the Society's International Collegiate Quartet Championship in 2008 and first place at IABS barbershop contest in 2007, and SNOBS gold in 2008.

Three members of Ringmasters are also members of Zero8, who are the European Champions for 2022 and the SNOBS Champion Chorus led by Rasmus Krigström of Ringmasters.The chorus was previously directed by Doug Harrington of Second Edition.

Members 
All four founding members attended Adolf Fredrik's Music School, and Stockholms Musikgymnasium, two high-profile music schools in Stockholm.
Jakob Stenberg – tenor / lead
Rasmus Krigström – tenor / lead
Emanuel Roll – baritone
Didier Linder – bass
Martin Wahlgren – original bass
Jakob and Rasmus are both tenor and switch lead roles depending on the composition.

Trivia 
 The quartet chose the name Ringmasters by flipping through an English dictionary and picking a word they liked.
 Ringmasters decided to form their group after viewing the Simpsons episode involving a barbershop quartet.
 Jakob's record for posting is 52 seconds.
 2016 was the quartet's 10 year anniversary.
 The quartet plays Dota 2 together.

Discography 
Ringmasters I (CD; 2012)
Ringmasters II (CD; 2013)
Ringmasters III (CD; 2014)
 Ringmasters IV  (CD; 2022)

External links 
 Ringmasters.se
 Barbershop Harmony Society
 Entry at the Association of International Champions

References 

Barbershop Harmony Society
Barbershop quartets
Swedish musical groups